Alexei Kamenski is a Russian sport shooter. He competed at the 2012 Summer Olympics in the Men's 10 metre air rifle.

References

Russian male sport shooters
Year of birth missing (living people)
Living people
Olympic shooters of Russia
Shooters at the 2012 Summer Olympics